"Fearless" is the third track on the 1971 album Meddle by Pink Floyd.  It is a slow acoustic guitar-driven song written by Roger Waters and David Gilmour, and includes audio of football fans singing "You'll Never Walk Alone".  It was also released as the B-side of the single along with "One of These Days", and was praised by critics as one of the better songs from Meddle.

Recording
The song's slow tempo and mellow acoustic sound bear similarities to some of the other tracks on the first side of the album. Roger Waters performed the acoustic guitar parts using an open tuning in G major, taught to Waters by former member Syd Barrett.

Near the beginning and at the end of the song, a field recording of fans in Liverpool's Kop singing "You'll Never Walk Alone" is superimposed over the music. This Rodgers and Hammerstein song became the anthem of Liverpool F.C. after Gerry & the Pacemakers had a number one hit with their recording.

Other releases
Although it was not released as a single in the UK and never played live, it was released as the "B-side" of the single "One of These Days" in 1971. Roger Waters briefly resurrected the song for a small number of shows in 2016, and the song was played by Nick Mason's Saucerful of Secrets on their tours in 2018, 2019 and 2022.

This song was one of several to be considered for the band's "best of" album, Echoes: The Best of Pink Floyd, but was ultimately rejected for inclusion.

Reception
In a review for the Meddle album, Jean-Charles Costa of Rolling Stone described "Fearless" as "a clever spoof" that "leads up to a classic crowd rendition of Rodgers & Hammerstein's "You'll Never Walk Alone"." Classic Rock Review described "Fearless" as "the best overall song on the album and talks about meeting challenges in the face of adversity." They went on saying "Fearless" is "highlighted by Gilmour’s calm yet strong guitar strumming and the odd beat from drummer Nick Mason."

Personnel
 David Gilmour – double-tracked vocals, acoustic and electric guitars
 Roger Waters – bass guitar, acoustic guitar  
 Richard Wright – piano
 Nick Mason – drums, tambourine

with:

 Liverpool F.C. Fans Kop – chanting "You'll Never Walk Alone"

In popular culture
 In Richard Linklater's film Everybody Wants Some!! (2016), stoner/philosopher Willoughby (Wyatt Russell) plays Pink Floyd's "Fearless" for his housemates while praising the arrangement.

References

Pink Floyd songs
1971 songs
1970s ballads
Liverpool F.C. songs
Folk rock songs
Rock ballads
Songs written by David Gilmour
Songs written by Roger Waters
Song recordings produced by David Gilmour
Song recordings produced by Roger Waters
Song recordings produced by Richard Wright (musician)
Song recordings produced by Nick Mason